Frederick Butler (29 December 1857 – 26 February 1923) was an English first-class cricketer active 1881–90 who played for Nottinghamshire. He was born in Radcliffe-on-Trent; died in Staten Island.

References

1857 births
1923 deaths
English cricketers
Nottinghamshire cricketers
North v South cricketers
Northumberland cricketers